Storms or Dangerous Girl (Italian: Bufere, French: Fille dangereuse) is a 1953 French-Italian melodrama film directed by Guido Brignone and starring Jean Gabin, Silvana Pampanini and Carla Del Poggio. It was shot at the Farnesina Studios of Titanus in Rome. The film's sets were designed by the art director Ottavio Scotti. Location shooting took place around Perugia where the film is set.

Synopsis
A renowned surgeon becomes involved with an attractive circus trapeze artist with the relationship threatening his marriage and family life.

Cast
 Jean Gabin as Il professor Antonio Sanna
 Silvana Pampanini (French version: Raymonde Devarennes) as Daisy Parnell
 Carla Del Poggio (French version: Camille Fournier) as Maria Sanna
 Serge Reggiani as Sergio (Serge) Parnell
 Mario Ferrari as Il prefetto
 Enrico Olivieri as Mario Sanna
 Paolo Stoppa as Amedeo Cini (Italian version)
 René Lefèvre as Amédée Didier (French version)
 Bruno Smith as Il presentatore al teatro 
 Edda Soligo as Un'infermiera

References

Bibliography
 Bayman, Louis. The Operatic and the Everyday in Postwar Italian Film Melodrama. Edinburgh University Press, 2014.
 Chiti, Roberto & Poppi, Roberto. Dizionario del cinema italiano: Dal 1945 al 1959. Gremese Editore, 1991.
 Gundle, Stephen. Fame Amid the Ruins: Italian Film Stardom in the Age of Neorealism. Berghahn Books, 2019.
 Harriss, Joseph. Jean Gabin: The Actor Who Was France. McFarland, 2018.

External links

1953 films
1950s French-language films
Films directed by Guido Brignone
1953 drama films
Italian drama films
French drama films
Titanus films
1950s French films
1950s Italian films